The following is a history of strike action in association football.

History

England
During 1960 the Professional Footballers' Association (PFA), led by Jimmy Hill, organised a campaign seeking the abolition of the maximum wage, which then stood at £20 per week, and of the retain and transfer system. Following talks involving the PFA, the Football Association, the Football League and the Ministry of Labour, the Football League committee offered a gradual increase in the maximum to £30, taking place over five years. At a PFA meeting in London, 250 players voted unanimously for strike action. Two further meetings elsewhere in the country brought the total to 712 players, of whom 18 voted against strike action. On 9 January 1961 the League made a revised proposal, but PFA members rejected it by a three to one margin. On 18 January, three days before the planned strike, the parties agreed to an immediate abolition of the maximum wage and the strike was called off.

In September 2011, players from Plymouth Argyle considered going on strike, due to a dispute over wages.

Italy
Serie A experienced its first ever player strike in March 1996. The start to the 2011–12 season was delayed due to strike action by players, following a failure of the players' and clubs' respective unions to agree on a new collective bargaining agreement. On 5 September 2011, the strike was called off after a compromise was reached.

Norway
In Norway, short-term player strike action led to the cancellation of fixtures in the Tippeligaen and Adeccoligaen in both June 2002 and May 2011. The 2002 dispute concerned insurance terms and general working conditions. The 2011 action was prompted by regulations on holidays and whether players were required to use football boots and sports equipment produced by respective club sponsors. In both periods the disputes were settled after one round of league fixtures.

Portugal

Scotland

Spain
In November 2009, Spanish players threatened a strike due to tax increases.

In March 2011, Spanish league matches were postponed due to a dispute over television revenue, but a week later the strike was blocked by the Spanish courts.

In August 2011, further strike action was announced, after players asked for a guaranteed wage, in case their clubs went bankrupt, and the strike action disrupted the first week of the Spanish season. Players including Ikechukwu Uche came out to the media to discuss why they were going on strike.

On 25 August, it was announced that talks between the Liga de Futbol Profesional (LFP) and Association of Spanish Footballers had reached a resolution, and that league football would resume the next weekend.

In March 2012, professional footballers from Rayo Vallecano went on strike in support of the 2011–2012 Spanish protests.

A 2013–14 Copa del Rey match between Racing Santander and Real Sociedad was suspended after the Santander players refused to play, having worked without pay for several months.

United States
Members of the MLS Players Union voted for a strike to delay the start of the 2010 Major League Soccer season, as scheduled for March 2010. The main issues for the players related to guaranteed contracts and freedom of transfer. The season commenced as planned when the dispute was settled five days before the first game.

References

Sports labor disputes
Association football controversies
Association football culture